Saor Éire (meaning 'Free Ireland') was a far-left political organisation established in September 1931 by communist-leaning members of the Irish Republican Army, with the backing of the IRA leadership. Notable among its founders was Peadar O'Donnell, former editor of An Phoblacht and a leading far-left figure in the IRA.  Saor Éire described itself as "an organisation of workers and working farmers".

It has been suggested that the support of the then IRA chief of staff, Moss (Maurice) Twomey, was instrumental in the organisation's establishment.  However, Tim Pat Coogan claimed that Twomey was doubtful about the organisation, worrying about involvement in electoral politics and possible communist influence.

During its short existence Saor Éire used the republican publication An Phoblacht, under the editorship of Frank Ryan, to report on its progress and to promote its far-left republican views.

History
On the weekend of 26 to 27 September 1931, Saor Éire held its first conference in Dublin at Iona Hall. One hundred and fifty delegates from both the Irish Free State and Northern Ireland attended the conference against a background of police raids on the houses and offices connected with Saor Éire and An Phoblacht. Seán Hayes was chairman, while David Fitzgerald (Tipperary)acted as secretary.

The conference elected an executive of Hayes, Fitzgerald, Sean McGuinness, May Laverty (Belfast), Helena Molony, Sheila Dowling, Sheila Humphreys, D. McGinley, Mick Fitzpatrick, Seán MacBride, Michael Price, Peadar O'Donnell, Mick Hallissey (Kerry), M. O'Donnell (Offaly), Patrick McCormack (Antrim), Tom Kenny (Galway), L. Brady (Laois), Nicholas Boran (Kilkenny), John Mulgrew (Mayo) and Tom Maguire (Westmeath).  George Gilmore and Frank Ryan were also involved.

The constitution elaborated upon the aims by describing a two-phase programme. The first phase was described as being one of organisation and propagandising in order to organise a solid front for mass resistance to the oppressors. This would build upon the day-to-day resistance and activity towards "rents, annuities, evictions, seizures, bank sales, lock-outs, strikes and wage-cuts." This challenge, it was believed, would lead to power passing from the hands of the imperialists to the masses. The second phase was one of consolidation of power through the organisation of the economy and a workers' and working farmers' republic.

Ideologically Saor Éire adhered to the Irish socialist republicanism developed by James Connolly and Peadar O'Donnell. As a consequence of the heavy influence of O'Donnell, Saor Éire strongly advocated the revival of Gaelic culture and the involvement of the poorer rural working communities in any rise against the Irish capitalist institutions and British imperialism.

Sean McBride described the organisation at its launch like this:

The organisation was attacked by the centre-right press and the Catholic Church as a dangerous communist group, and was quickly banned by the Free State government. The strength of reaction against it prevented it becoming an effective political organisation. O'Donnell and his supporters would attempt a similar initiative two years later with the establishment of the Republican Congress in 1933.

Policies
The constitution listed the organisation’s objectives as being:

 To achieve an independent revolutionary leadership for the working class and working farmers towards the overthrow of British imperialism and its ally, Irish capitalism.
 To organise and consolidate the Republic of Ireland on the basis of the possession and administration by the workers and working farmers, of the land, instruments of production, distribution, and exchange.
 To restore and foster the Irish language, culture, and games.

See also
 Republican Congress
 Connolly Column

References

1931 disestablishments in Ireland
1931 establishments in Ireland
Communist organisations in Ireland
Defunct organisations based in Northern Ireland
Defunct organisations based in the Republic of Ireland
Irish Republican Army (1922–1969)
Irish republican organisations
Organizations disestablished in 1931
Organizations established in 1931
Socialist organisations in the United Kingdom